Muhammad Ishaq Dar (born 23 May 1950) is a senior Pakistani politician; chartered accountant a veteran businessman & investor; a philanthropist mainly focused on child welfare & protection; former member of the National Assembly of Pakistan and an incumbent member of the Senate of Pakistan serving as the 42nd Finance Minister of Pakistan since September 28, 2022.

He is a former Federal Minister for Industries & Investment and Federal Minister for Commerce; and, is the fourth time federal Minister for Finance of Pakistan - the only politician in the history of Pakistan to have served for four terms on the top post.

Born in 1950 and grew up in Lahore, Dar was educated at the Hailey College of Commerce, Government College University, later attending the Institute of Chartered Accountants in England and Wales. Prior to entering politics, he worked as a professional chartered accountant in various private and public-sector organizations. He was highly-regarded for his innovative, prudent & fastidious financial management, discipline and control in the corporate world resulting in cost-savings & improved bottom-lines. The same was noticed & admired by the royal families of Saudi Arabia, UAE, Qatar, Bahrain, etc. He was soon advising the royal families on large-scale investments & business ventures across the globe to their advantage.

In Pakistan, Ishaq Dar started his political career in early 1980s; and, since then he has been elected to the National Assembly of Pakistan twice from Lahore and to the Senate of Pakistan for four times from Punjab. He hold his first public office as the Chairman of Pakistan Board of Investment for a year during the first government of Nawaz Sharif. After the PML-N victory in the 1997 general election, he held the cabinet portfolios of Minister for Commerce; Minister for Industries & Investment and Minister for Finance & Revenue - making him one of the most prolific men of crises and decision-makers in the country; when it came to macroeconomic issues, balance of payment crises, energy security, bilateral & multilateral debts, food security, diplomatic crises, parliamentary politics and international disputes settlements for Pakistan.

In 2003, he made his debut in the Senate where he would later become Leader of the Opposition from 2012 to 2013. After the formation of a coalition government following the 2008 general election, he briefly re-appointed as the Finance Minister for the second time under Prime Minister Yousaf Raza Gillani. In 2013, during the third government of Nawaz Sharif, Dar was re-appointed as the Minister for Finance for the third time where he served until the dissolution of the cabinet following the removal from office of Prime Minister Nawaz Sharif in July 2017. In August 2017, he was inducted into the cabinet of Prime Minister Shahid Khaqan Abbasi and was re-appointed as Minister for Finance for the fourth time.

In March 2018, he was re-elected to the Senate of Pakistan as the returning senator from Punjab on a technocrat seat and the Election Commission of Pakistan (ECP) has also reversed the suspension of his victory notification and restored his victory notification on January 9, 2023.

Early life and education
Muhammad Ishaq Dar was born in 1950. He earned a bachelor's degree in commerce from the Hailey College of Commerce of the University of the Punjab in Lahore; which he attended from 1966 to 1969. He then attended Government College University in Lahore. Dar was awarded two merit gold medals and a roll of honor for first position in B.Com. (Hons) at the University of Punjab. Interestingly, Nawaz Sharif had been his batch mate at Government College University Lahore from 1964 to 1966.

Dar became an Associate Member of the Institute of Chartered Accountants in England and Wales in 1974, he achieved his certification in chartered accountancy. He was one of the youngest Pakistanis at the time to have passed the esteemed professional qualification. In 1975, he became associate member of the Institute of Chartered Accountants of Pakistan as well. He obtained fellowship in the Institute of Chartered Accountants in England and Wales in 1980 and in the Institute of Chartered Accountants of Pakistan in 1984. Currently, he is a fellow member of the Pakistan Institute of Public Finance Accountants and Institute of Chartered Accountants in England and Wales as well.

Early career
Professionally, Dar is a chartered & management accountant and economist After having worked as director of finance in a London-based textile corporation from 1974 to 1976, Dar moved to Libya in 1976 and worked for the Government of Libya as senior auditor in the Office of the Auditor General's Department in Tripoli.
 On returning to Pakistan in 1977, he became partner in a chartered accountancy firm and in 1980 he became financial adviser to Nazir & Company - a multinational construction company.

Political career

Initial political career
Dar began his political career in the late 1980s with the Pakistan Muslim League (N) as a member of its central executive committee (CEC); and, since then he has remained one of closest aides of Nawaz Sharif & a key federal cabinet member of Nawaz Sharif in all of his three governments. Later on, in the first government of Shehbaz Sharif; the 23rd Prime Minister of Pakistan. After receiving recognition at the national level in 1990 for his suggestions on provincial & federal government budgets, he became the top advisor to Nawaz Sharif on monetary, fiscal, taxation, industrial, trade and national debt management.

Ishaq Dar also facilitated Sharif Family to obtain a PKR 100 million line of credit, under the Islamic finance principles of Modarba; which is a special kind of partnership where one partner gives money to another for investing in a commercial enterprise.

In 1992, Dar held his first public office under Prime Minister Nawaz Sharif as the Chairman of Pakistan Board of Investment (BOI) with a status of Minister of State till 1993. He served in a pro bono role. He immediately resigned after the government was dismissed by the then President of Pakistan, Ghulam Ishaq Khan under the notorious clause 58 2(b). It is pertinent to note that the clause 58-B has been removed for being undemocratic under Eighteenth Amendment to the Constitution of Pakistan. After leaving BOI 1993, he won the elections for the President of Lahore Chamber of Commerce and Industry that same year.

Dar made his Parliament debut after running for a seat in the National Assembly of Pakistan in a by-election held after 1993 general election as a candidate of the PML-N for the Lahore NA-95 constituency after the seat was vacated by Nawaz Sharif who had won the seat in two different constituencies in 1993 general election. After receiving 39,483 votes (62%), he was elected to the National Assembly. His tenure as Member of the National Assembly was terminated upon the dissolution of the National Assembly in 1996 following the dismissal of the Benazir Bhutto government by the then-President, Farooq Leghari.

As Minister for Commerce and Finance
After new snap elections were called for in 1997, Dar ran for a National Assembly seat as a candidate of the PML-N and was successfully re-elected to represent the Lahore NA-97 constituency by securing 61,556 votes. After the PML-N had won a clear majority in the National Assembly for the second time, Dar was invited into the cabinet of Prime Minister Nawaz Sharif as a federal minister and was appointed as the Minister for Industries and Investment in February 1997 where he served until July 1997. In December 1997, he was made the Minister for Commerce. After Pakistan tested its nuclear weapons in May 1998, other countries responded with heavy economic sanctions against Pakistan. When the economy plummeted, Dar was given the additional cabinet portfolio of Minister for Finance with the additional charge of Revenue, Economic Affairs and Statistics. Dar helped conclude negotiations for an International Monetary Fund (IMF) bailout package to deal with an economic crisis that had been triggered by the sanctions. Dar continued to serve in both cabinet positions until the 1999 Pakistani coup d'état, during which the then-Chief of Army Staff, General Pervez Musharraf, overthrew Nawaz Sharif and his existing elected government. Dar spent nearly two years in jail under Musharraf over corruption charges that never went to trial. His tenure as Member of the National Assembly was also terminated after the assembly's dissolution in 1999 as a result of the coup. Dar remained loyal to the PML-N during Musharraf's rule despite pressure by the Pakistan Army to switch allegiance from Nawaz Sharif. However, during his detention in 2000, Dar accused Nawaz Sharif of having engaged in money laundering in the late 1990s and, in connection with the infamous Hudabya Papers Mills case, Dar confessed to laundering US$14.86 million on behalf of the Nawaz Sharif. Later, he retreated from his statement, saying it had been extracted under duress. After having been released from jail during the Pervez Musharraf rule in Pakistan, Dar moved to the United Arab Emirates, where he worked as a financial adviser to a member of the ruling family, a position he held until 2008. In 2002 he was made president of PML-N's International Affairs office.

Third tenure as Pakistan's Federal Minister for Finance & Revenue

For the 2013 general election, Dar was made part of the PML-N's central parliamentary board tasked with selecting candidates for the election. Upon the victory of the PML-N in the 2013 general election, Dar resigned from his position as Opposition Leader in the Senate and was invited to join the federal cabinet after the government was formed by Prime Minister Nawaz Sharif in June 2013. He was for the third time made the Federal Minister for Finance and was given the additional cabinet portfolios of Revenue, Economic Affairs, Statistics and Privatisation. In 2014 Dar was given the chairmanship of the Special Parliamentary Committee on Election Reforms and of Economic Coordination Committee by Nawaz Sharif. During the third premiership of Nawaz Sharif, Dar was considered so powerful that he was dubbed the defacto Deputy Prime Minister of Pakistan, mainly because of his family relationship with Nawaz Sharif. At one point he was serving as the chairman of over 45 committees. Dar was considered the most powerful member of Nawaz Sharif cabinet who in 2016, looked after important government matters when Nawaz Sharif underwent heart surgery in the United Kingdom.

In July 2016 the National Accountability Bureau (NAB) cleared Dar in an over Rs130 billion corruption case. Dar had previously stated several times that he was facing no corruption case; however, the closing of an investigation against him negated his earlier claims. The NAB had included Dar's case in the list of 179 mega-corruption cases since 2001. It was reported that the case was closed due to "immense pressure" from within the NAB or from the federal government despite the fact that enough evidence was available against Dar for a conviction.

Dar was disqualified to hold the office of Minister of Finance on 28 July 2017 by the Supreme Court of Pakistan after then-Prime Minister Nawaz Sharif was also disqualified by the same court following a decision in the Panama Papers case. On the same day Dar ceased to hold ministerial office when the federal cabinet was disbanded after Nawaz Sharif resigned as Prime Minister. Following the election of Shahid Khaqan Abbasi as the new prime minister in early August 2017, Dar was invited to join the federal cabinet of Abbasi despite his disqualification and an investigation having been ordered against him by the Supreme Court. He was inducted into the cabinet and was re-appointed to the same portfolio in the Government – as the Federal Minister for Finance however with lesser powers as Shahid Khaqan Abbasi in order to minimize the role of Dar in government affairs had bifurcated the Ministry of Finance, Revenue, Economic Affairs, Statistics and Privatisation into three separate ministires by separating Statistics and Privatisation, with Dar heading ministry comprising three divisions – Finance, Revenue, Economic Affairs. He was removed from the chairmanship of major policymaking bodies such as the Economic Coordination Committee and the Council of Common Interests. On 20 August 2017 he was removed from the chairmanship of some 35 National Assembly committees by Shahid Khaqan Abbasi thus further reducing Dar's influence. It was noted that the move to limit Dar to the Ministry of Finance only was made at the direction of the Sharif family. In September 2017 a NAB court in Pakistan indicted Dar in the Panama Papers corruption case for having wealth beyond his known sources of income, but, despite criticism from the opposition parties, he continued to serve as finance minister. In October 2017 he fell ill while in Saudi Arabia and left for the United Kingdom for medical treatment.

In November 2017 the court issued a non-bailable arrest warrant for him while he was in London for not appearing in court. It was reported that he may lose his ministerial portfolio due to the corruption case against him on the grounds that he has become ineffective and unable to carry out the responsibilities of a Minister. On 21November a court declared him an absconder. Amid the rumors that he had already resigned from the ministerial office due to pressure and criticism, he on 22November vacated the ministerial office of Finance after taking a medical leave His cabinet portfolio of Finance Minister was withdrawn however, he continued to remain a member of the federal cabinet as a federal minister without portfolio. It was noted that Dar has refused to leave the Finance Ministry and that he took a temporary medical leave for three months after which he may retook the office upon his return to Pakistan. During his third tenure as Finance Minister, he has been credited for stabilizing the economy of Pakistan for three years after 2013; in particularly steering country out of balance of payments crisis in 2013. The economic policies of Dar, referred to by some as Darnomics, were commended by international media and economic experts for reviving economy of Pakistan however at the same time were criticised by the opposition political parties during Dar's time in office such as for having obtained $35billion in foreign loans and for manipulating statistics to show a better economic performance for the country. In December 2017, An accountability court declared Dar a proclaimed offender in a corruption case after he repeatedly failed to appear before the court and subsequently was called fugitive by the court.

On 26 December, Prime Minister Abbasi elevated his special assistant on Economic Affairs Miftah Ismail as his Adviser on Finance, Revenue and Economic Affairs with the status of a federal minister as successor of Dar. Abbasi continued to hold the ministerial office of Finance.

In january 2023, Ministry of Wealth in Pakistan requested US support in reviving IMF program to improve economy hit by floods and global economic challenges.

In Opposition & Post-Ministerial Parliamentary Politics

In October 2016, the Finance Ministry announced that the IMF conferred the "Finance Minister of the Year for South Asia" award to Dar. After which the IMF had to issue a statement saying the newspaper did not belong to it and that it was an independent publication. It was noted that five Pakistani state-owned firms funded the Emerging Markets edition, which carried a supplement on Pakistan.

In Opposition
After a stay of several months outside Pakistan, Dar returned to Pakistan in 2003 to run for a seat in the Senate as a candidate of PML-N and was elected for the first time, for a term of three years. During his tenure as Member of the Senate, he served as Parliamentary Leader of the PML-N in the Senate. He was re-elected to the Senate in the 2006 senate election as a candidate of PML-N, this time for a term of six years. During his tenure as Member of the Senate between 2003 and 2012, he remained the Parliamentary Leader of the PML-N in the Senate.

After the formation of a coalition government between the PPP and PML-N with Yousaf Raza Gillani as Prime Minister, following the 2008 general election, which had resulted in a hung parliament where the PPP had secured the largest number of seats in the National Assembly and the PML-N the second largest, Dar due to his expertise in finance and economics, was invited to join the cabinet of Yousaf Raza Gillani with the status of a federal minister in March 2008 and was re-appointed as the Minister for Finance with the additional cabinet portfolio of revenue, economic affairs and statistics. However, his tenure as Minister for Finance was short-lived after the PML-N left the PPP-led coalition government in May 2008 to lead the movement to impeach Pervez Musharraf and to restore the judiciary after the coalition failed to restore the judiciary, as agreed between PML-N and PPP in the Bhurban Accord. During his brief tenure as finance minister, he was criticized for causing the rupee fall, bank run and panic in the market. Meanwhile, he has been credited for proposing the idea of the Benazir Income Support Programme, a Pakistani government aid program to provide financial assistance to low-income families which is said to be one of the largest in South Asia. Dar claimed that the original name of the organisation proposed was Pakistan Income Support Programme but that it was renamed by PPP for political gains after he stepped down form the ministerial office.

In 2011 Dar was decorated with Nishan-e-Imtiaz, the highest civil award given to Pakistani nationals, for his parliamentary service in Pakistan. However, he refused to receive it from the then-President, Asif Ali Zardari. Dar was re-elected to the Senate for the third time in the 2012 senate election, for six years as a candidate of PML-N on technocrat seat from Punjab after which he was appointed by Nawaz Sharif as the Parliamentary Leader of the PML-N in the Senate. A few days later he was elected as the Leader of the Opposition in the Senate, replacing Abdul Ghafoor Haideri for his negotiation skills with PPP government on major issues. During his tenure as Member of the Senate, he remained member of the various Standing Committees of Senate such as defence and defence production, foreign affairs, Kashmir affairs and Gilgit-Baltistan, commerce and finance, revenue, economic affairs, statistics, planning and development and privatisation. He also served as a member of the Special Committee on Constitutional Reforms, and co-prepared and passed the 18th, the 19th, and the 20th amendments to the Constitution of Pakistan.

Post-ministerial parliamentary politics
In February 2018, the name of Dar was shortlisted by PML-N amongst the candidate for March 2018 Senate election after which Dar filed his nomination papers for a general seat and a technocrat seat in the Senate. However the Election Commission of Pakistan rejected his nomination papers. On 17 February, Lahore High Court granted permission to Dar to participate in the Senate elections. On 22 February, the Election Commission of Pakistan declared all PML-N candidates for the Senate election as independent after a ruling of the Supreme Court. On 3 March 2018, he was re-elected to the Senate as an independent candidate on technocrat seat from Punjab with the backing by PML-N. On 12 March 2018, he ceased to hold the position of a federal minister due to expiration of his Senate term.

In May 2018, the Supreme Court ordered the ECP to suspend the notification of Senator-elect Dar as member of the Senate for his failure to appear before the court. As of June 2018, he did not take oath of Senator. In June 2018, the ECP suspended the Senate membership of Dar. On 10 July, the Supreme Court ordered Dar to appear before court within three days. Interpol Red Notice for Dar was issued by the government of Pakistan on 14 July to bring him back to Pakistan.

In August 2018, the NAB approved an inquiry into a graft case against Dar for illegally awarding a Next Generation Mobile Services contract and for committing alleged financial irregularities. In September, his passport was cancelled by the government of Pakistan making him a stateless person. The same month, a British parliamentary team rejected an online petition seeking the deportation of Dar on the ground that there is no extradition treaty between the two countries.

Personal life & outcomes of court cases
Dar belongs to a family of businessmen and traders of Kashmiri origin. He is regarded as the most trusted aide and policy czar of the Sharif family. In 2004, Dar's eldest son married Nawaz Sharif's daughter Asma Nawaz in Jeddah, Saudi Arabia.

Dar runs two charitable organisations as well. These trusts are aimed to provide shelter to the homeless children or orphans, provide student schloarships and organize mass wedding ceremonies for the less priviledged.

Dar is also an accomplished entrepreneur, businessman and investor; and, his declared assets stand at PKR. 583 million and investments at PKR. 325 million in Pakistan Investment Bonds. As of February 2022, all his personal assets, assets belonging to his family and those owned by his charitable organizations have been unfreezed under court orders.

References

Living people
1950 births
Pakistani accountants
Pakistani expatriates in Libya
Pakistani expatriates in the United Kingdom
Pakistani prisoners and detainees
Politicians from Lahore
Pakistani MNAs 1993–1996
Pakistani MNAs 1997–1999
Pakistani people of Kashmiri descent
Pakistani senators (14th Parliament)
Pakistan Muslim League (N) MNAs
Finance Ministers of Pakistan
Government College University, Lahore alumni
Hailey College of Commerce alumni
World Bank people
Recipients of Nishan-e-Imtiaz
Pakistani officials of the United Nations
Fugitives wanted by Pakistan
Pakistani politicians convicted of corruption
Pakistani exiles
Stateless people
Pakistani Muslims